Cordylanthus nidularius is a rare species of flowering plant in the family Orobanchaceae known by the common name Mt. Diablo bird's beak.

Distribution
The plant is endemic to Mount Diablo, in the northern Diablo Range within Contra Costa County, in the East Bay region of northern California.

Description
Cordylanthus nidularius is a small annual herb. It foliage is red-tinted gray-green in color, and coated with glandular hairs and woolly fibers.

The flowers are each surrounded by 2 or 3 bracts divided into three narrow lobes up to 1.5 centimeters long. The corolla is a purple-streaked white pouch enclosed in a calyx of sepals.  The bloom period is during July and August.

Conservation
This is a state and California Native Plant Society listed Critically endangered species.  It is currently known from only one occurrence on Mt. Diablo, which is threatened by trail construction and recreation, and possibly by fire suppression.

References

External links
 Calflora Database: Cordylanthus nidularius (Mt. Diablo bird's beak)
Jepson Manual eFlora (TJM2) treatment of Cordylanthus nidularius
USDA Plants Profile
U.C. Photos gallery: Cordylanthus nidularius images

nidularius
Endemic flora of California
Mount Diablo
Natural history of the California chaparral and woodlands
Natural history of the California Coast Ranges
Natural history of Contra Costa County, California
Critically endangered flora of California
Endemic flora of the San Francisco Bay Area